Line S7 of the Nanjing Metro is a north–south suburban rapid transit line primarily serving Nanjing's Lishui District, running from  to , and was opened on 26 May 2018. The line is served by 4 car type B trains with a maximum speed of 100 km/h. The line is designed to allow for 6 cars trains to accommodate long term growth.

Opening timeline

Station list

Notes

References

Railway lines opened in 2018
2018 establishments in China
Nanjing Metro lines
Airport rail links in China